Legends of Lust (風月奇譚) is a 1972 Hong Kong adult comedy film.

References

External links
 IMDb entry

1972 films
Hong Kong sex comedy films
1970s Mandarin-language films
Films directed by Li Han-hsiang
1970s sex comedy films
1972 comedy films
1970s Hong Kong films